The year 2022 in architecture involved some significant architectural events and new buildings.

Events

1 March - Russian shelling of Freedom Square in Kharkiv severely damages the Regional State Administration Building and more heritage listed buildings.
16 March - Shelling in Mariupol destroys Donetsk Regional Drama Theatre.
8 October - Crimean Bridge between Crimea and Russia, the longest bridge in Europe, the road section of the bridge collapsed due to explosion.

Buildings and structures

Taiwan
 Taipei Performing Arts Center, designed by Rem Koolhaas and David Gianotten at Office for Metropolitan Architecture, opens officially on 7 August.
 United Arab Emirates 

 The Museum of the Future designed by Killa Design architecture studio and engineered by Buro Happold opened to public on 22 February in Dubai.
India

 The Viswas Swaroopam, depicting Shiva opens on 29 October in Rajasthan.

Awards
 AIA Gold Medal – Angela Brooks and Lawrence Scarpa 
 Driehaus Architecture Prize for New Classical Architecture – Rob Krier
 Pritzker Architecture Prize – Diébédo Francis Kéré
 RIBA Royal Gold Medal – B. V. Doshi
 Stirling Prize – The New Library, Magdalene College, Cambridge

Upcoming
 European Union Prize for Contemporary Architecture (Mies van der Rohe Prize) – (announced end April)
 Aga Khan Award for Architecture – (announced autumn)

Exhibitions

 6 Feb - 2 July: MoMA New York: "The Project of Independence: Architectures of Decolonization in South Asia, 1947–1985", curated by Martino Stierli and Anoma Pieris.

Deaths
 January 11 - Eberhard Zeidler, 95, German-born Canadian architect (Eaton Centre) (b. 1926)
 January 14 - Ricardo Bofill, 82, Spanish architect (b. 1939)
 March 17 - Christopher Alexander, 85, Austrian born British-American architect and design theorist (b. 1936)
 August 9 - Miles Warren, 93, New Zealand architect  (b. 1929)
 August 16
 Mark Girouard, 90, English architectural writer and historian (b. 1931)
 John Rauch, 91, American architect (b. 1930)
August 23 - José Vivas, 94, Venezuelan architect (b. 1928)
September 9 - James Polshek, 92, American architect (Clinton Presidential Center, the Brooklyn Museum) (b. 1930)
September 17 - Vlado Milunić, 81, Croatian-Czech architect (Dancing House) (b. 1941)
October 14 - Étienne Gaboury, 92, Canadian architect (Royal Canadian Mint- Winnipeg, Saint Boniface Cathedral, Esplanade Riel)  (b. 1930)
October 20 - Blanche Lemco van Ginkel, 98, British-born Canadian architect and city planner (Expo 67) (b. 1923)
November 10 - Agustín Hernández Navarro, 98, Mexican architect (b. 1924)
December 29 - Arata Isozaki, 91, Japanese architect (Kitakyushu Municipal Museum of Art, MOCA, Nagi Museum Of Contemporary Art), Pritzker Prize winner (2019) (b. 1931)

See also
Timeline of architecture

References

 
2022-related lists
Architecture
21st-century architecture